A Toothy Smile is a 1957 Polish short film written and directed by Roman Polanski. A man walks down the exterior staircase of some building, He passes a small window. He looks in, and there a young woman standing at a washbasin, drying her hair with a towel that covers her face. The man is interrupted by a door opening, the occupant begins bringing out empty bottles. The man starts down the stairs, only to return to the window after the door has closed. He again looks in the window and is surprised.

In his autobiography, Roman Polanski says that the theme was set for him by a supervisor at film school.

External links
 

1957 films
Films directed by Roman Polanski
Films with screenplays by Roman Polanski
Polish short films
1950s Polish-language films
Polish independent films